Fusitriton retiolus is a species of large predatory sea snail, a marine gastropod mollusc in the family Cymatiidae.

Distribution 
This species occurs in:
 Australia
 New Zealand.

References

Cymatiidae
Gastropods described in 1914